Ruby Dhal is a British-Afghan poet, entrepreneur and author based in London. Born in India, Dhal emigrated to the UK at a young age with her family. She started a writing page on Instagram in 2016, eventually becoming a popular "instapoet". She has written 5 books, including 3 best-selling books.

Early life 
She started to develop an interest in books, which were originally a form of escapism, and started reading and writing at a young age.

In 2015, she graduated with a bachelor of arts degree in Philosophy from University College London. She completed her masters of arts in philosophy in King's College London and graduated in 2017. She lives in London, United Kingdom with her family.

Career 
She sold 350 copies of her first poetry book, Memories Unwound, in the first month. She then published A Handful of Stars in May 2019, My Hope For Tomorrow in December 2019, and Dear Self and Between us in 2020 and 2021, respectively. As of 2022, she has sold over 50,000 books, and has more than 500,000 followers on Instagram.

Bibliography

Awards and achievements 
Dhal has been featured on multiple platforms and magazines. She was featured in the Harper's Bazaar India Writer Hotlist 2017, and Utwine.me's list of insta-poets, aspioneer's 20 under 40 and The Love Post's Colours of a Changemaker series' interviews. She also has been interviewed by BBC Radio One and BBC Asian Network.

She was nominated for the Asian Women of Achievement Awards' Young Achiever award 2021.

See also 
 Rupi Kaur
 Nikita Gill

References

External links 
Ruby Dhal's interview at player FM
Ruby Dhal's podcasts

1994 births
21st-century British poets
21st-century British women writers
British Sikhs
British women poets
Instagram poets
Living people
People from London
Writers from London